William W. Rieger (November 2, 1922 – December 11, 2009) was a Democratic member of the Pennsylvania House of Representatives.

He is a 1941 graduate of Simon Gratz High School.

He was first elected to represent the 179th legislative district in 1966. During 40 year legislative career representing one of the state's poorest districts, he had only two bills passed into law (both in the 1970s). One dealt with loan calculations and another was about stop signs. His last measure to be enacted was a resolution declaring May 1983 to be "High Blood Pressure Month." The last bill he co-sponsored was in 1990. He served the Democratic party as chair of the board of directors of the 43rd Ward Democratic Executive Committee. He also served as co-chairman of the Philadelphia Legislative Delegation in the House.

He was criticized by his 1988 Democratic Primary opponent Benjamin Ramos for distributing campaign literature containing an "earthy Spanish term for excrement," which Rieger said was a printing mistake.

In a 2002 PoliticsPA Feature story designating politicians with yearbook superlatives, he was named "Missing in Action." In 2003, he was criticized by The Philadelphia Inquirer for his legislative inactivity and his absence from his district. He countered absenteeism claims by pointing to his ill health: he battled prostate cancer and received a coronary stent in 2002. Regarding his legislative inactivity, he said, "I could introduce 100 bills tomorrow. They wouldn't go anywhere. They would all be lies. And I don't want to lie to the people," he said.

He retired prior to the 2006 elections. He died on December 11, 2009, from a brain hemorrhage.

References

External links
 official PA House profile (archived)
 official Party website (archived)

1922 births
2009 deaths
Politicians from Philadelphia
Democratic Party members of the Pennsylvania House of Representatives
20th-century American politicians